UOB or UoB is the acronymic abbreviation for:
United Overseas Bank, a Singaporean multinational investment bank and financial services company
University of Baghdad
University of Bahrain
University of Balamand
University of Bath
University of Balochistan
University of Bedfordshire
University of Birmingham
University of Bolton
University of Bradford
University of Brighton
University of Bristol
Urwego Opportunity Bank, a microfinance bank in Rwanda